Cercis siliquastrum, commonly known as the Judas tree or Judas-tree, is a small deciduous tree in the flowering plant family Fabaceae which is noted for its prolific display of deep pink flowers in spring. It is native to Southern Europe and Western Asia.

Description

This species forms a small tree up to 12 m (39 ft) in height and 10 m (32 ft) in width.

The deep pink flowers are produced on year-old or older growth, including the trunk, in spring. Also, the flowers display a blossom with five free petals and fused sepals. This flower shape is typical of the pea family (Fabaceae). The leaves appear shortly after the first flowers emerge. These are cordate with a blunt apex, which occasionally has a shallow notch at the tip. The tree produces long flat pods that hang vertically. The flowers are edible and reportedly have a sweet-acid taste.

Taxonomy

The species was first described by Linnaeus in 1753 and he gave it the specific epithet of siliquastrum  which is derived from the Latin word siliqua, meaning "pod". The generic name comes from the Greek kerkis, a "shuttle", which refers to the resemblance shown to this weaver's tool by the flat, woody seedpods.

There are several varieties and subspecies including:-
var. hebecarpa Bornm.
nothosubsp. yaltikirii (Ponert) Govaerts
var. siliquastrum
var. alba Weston

Distribution and ecological aspects

The flowers are pollinated by bees, attracted by nectar. Pollen from the protruding stamens is deposited on the bee's body and carried to another flower's stigma.

In Israel the tree has a status of a protected plant.

British journalist Francis McCullagh reported seeing "innumerable" flowering specimens of this tree in Yildiz Park in Istanbul in April 1909.

Cultivation

Cultivars include:
'Afghan Deep Purple'
'Alba' - white flowers
'Bodnant'
'Carnea'
'Fructa Rubra'
'Penduliflora'
'Rubra' - dark pink-purple flowers
'Sterilis'
'Variegata'
'White Swan'

The cultivar 'Bodnant' has gained the Royal Horticultural Society's Award of Garden Merit. (confirmed 2017).

The tree is susceptible to leafhoppers,  scale insects and psyllids (specifically Cacopsylla pulchella) as well as diseases including canker, coral spot and verticillium wilt.

Propagation is by seed, cuttings or budding.

The species produces hard wood with an attractive grain. It is used in veneers and polishes well.

Culture
There is a myth that Judas Iscariot hanged himself from a tree of this species, causing its white flowers to turn red. This belief is related to the common name "Judas tree", which is possibly a corrupted derivation from the French common name, Arbre de Judée, meaning tree of Judea, referring to the hilly regions of that country where the tree used to be common. Another possible source for the vernacular name is the fact that the flowers and seedpods can dangle direct from the trunk in a way reminiscent of Judas's possible method of suicide.

A sermon illustration on the deadly effects of succumbing to temptation refers to a false idea that the Judas tree killed bees drawn to it: "Dr. Cuyler forcibly illustrates this by reference to the Judas tree. The blossoms appear before the leaves, and they are of a brilliant crimson. The flaming beauty of the flowers attracts innumerable insects; and the wandering bee is drawn after it to gather honey. But every bee which alights upon the blossom, imbibes a fatal opiate, and drops dead from among the crimson flowers to the earth."

Traditional medicine 
The Judas tree is referred to as a traditional Palestinian medicinal plant.

References

Further reading
International Legume Database & Information Service (ILDIS): Cercis siliquastrum
The Royal Horticultural Society : Circus siliquastrum
Wildflowers of Israel : Judas tree''

siliquastrum
Flora of Lebanon
Flora of Palestine (region)
Judas Iscariot
Plants described in 1753
Taxa named by Carl Linnaeus
Flora of the Mediterranean Basin